AlmaLinux is a free and open source Linux distribution, created originally by CloudLinux to provide a community-supported, production-grade enterprise operating system that is binary-compatible with Red Hat Enterprise Linux (RHEL). The first stable release of AlmaLinux was published on March 30, 2021, and will be supported through March 1, 2029.

Etymology 
The name of the distribution comes from the word "alma", meaning "soul" in Spanish and other Latin languages. It was chosen to be a homage to the Linux community.

History 
On December 8, 2020, Red Hat announced that development of CentOS Linux, a free-of-cost downstream fork of the commercial Red Hat Enterprise Linux (RHEL), would be discontinued and its official support would be cut short to focus on CentOS Stream, a stable LTS release without minor releases officially used by Red Hat to preview what is intended for inclusion in updates to RHEL. 

In response, CloudLinux – which maintains its own commercial Linux distribution, CloudLinux OS – created AlmaLinux to provide a community-supported spiritual successor to CentOS Linux, aiming for binary-compatibility with the current version of RHEL. A beta version of AlmaLinux was first released on February 1, 2021, and the first stable release of AlmaLinux was published on March 30, 2021. AlmaLinux 8.x will be supported until 2029. Numerous companies, such as ARM, AWS, Equinix, and Microsoft, also support AlmaLinux. On March 30, 2021, the AlmaLinux OS Foundation was created as a 501(c) organization to take over AlmaLinux development and governance from CloudLinux, which has promised $1 million in annual funding to the project.

In September of 2022 the AlmaLinux OS Foundation held its first election, announcing a board of 7 community-elected members on September 19th.

On December 7th, 2022 it was announced that CERN and Fermilab would be providing AlmaLinux as the standard operating system for their experiments.

Releases 

* AlmaLinux was announced , first beta release was 53 days later.

See also
 Fedora Linux, the upstream project from which AlmaLinux descends
 Rocky Linux, with development coordinated by the Rocky Enterprise Software Foundation (RESF)

References

External links 
 
 
 
 

Enterprise Linux distributions
Linux distributions
RPM-based Linux distributions